The Martin Ski Dome was a ski area located in Martin, Washington.

Skiing in Martin 
Starting in the early 1920s, skiers from Cle Elum and Seattle's King Street Station would ride the Northern Pacific Railroad to the Martin, Washington stop. The Seattle train left at 8AM, took about 3 hours to travel to Martin, waited 6 hours for the skiers and returned by 8PM. The railroad supplied "cozy warm shelter" in a dozen specially equipped bunk-cars and meal cars on a side track at the Martin station. Skiers could stay overnight and the railroad provided heating stoves and free coal.

Ski bowl opens in 1938 

In 1938, to capitalize on the newly popular sport of skiing, the Northern Pacific Railroad opened the Martin Ski Dome. It was located just across the railroad tracks from the Meany Ski Hut.

In 1939 the railroad spent $8,235 to build a Lodge with accommodations for 30 overnight guests and a nearby caretaker's cabin. The lodge had 400 guests their first year who had to furnish their own bedding. There were two large living rooms with fireplaces, bunks in the women's and men's dormitories and a kitchen where skiers could cook their own meals.

Starting in 1939, the Camp Fire Girls held annual holiday ski trips at the Martin Ski Dome.

In 1942 the facility closed with the start of World War II.

Husky Chalet 

In 1944 the Associated Students of the University of Washington reinstituted its winter sports program. On February 7, 1945 they purchased the buildings from Northern Pacific for $1,250 and leased the land for $25/year.

Those certain buildings known as the Northern Pacific Ski Dome Lodge and the Caretakers Cabin, including the furnishing, equipment and supplies connected therewith; also water supply system, including intake and pipe line, all located upon the following tracts of land in Kittitas County, State of Washington, to wit:
Those parts of the S 1⁄2 NE 1/4, SE 1/4 NW 1⁄2, E 1⁄2 E 1⁄2 SE1/4, N 1⁄2 SE 1/4, and SW 1/4 SE 1⁄2 , lying south of the 300 ft. right of way for the Bonneville Power Transmission Line and north of the 400 ft. right of way for the Northern Pacific Railway, in section 37, Township 21 North, Range 12 East, W. M., containing 137 acres, more or less.

The Husky Winter Sports Club reopened the site as the Husky Chalet with dorm lodging, 3 meals, ski lessons and rope tows for $2.25/day (1/3 the going rate).

In 1946 the HWSC membership topped 800 and they filled the lodge near capacity. To accommodate all the students, the HWSC also leased the nearby Rustic Inn located on the Sunset Highway (now I-90).

In 1947 the HWSC expanded the lodge (to sleep 120). Mattresses and pillows were now provided as well as showers and wash rooms. They also added floodlights for night skiing, a PA system for music, and gasoline drums to power the longer and now faster rope tows that ran at 750 feet a minute.

The UW ski team trained and held intercollegiate competitions at the site. Teams came from Utah, Eastern Washington College of Education, University of British Columbia, Montana State, Idaho, Washington State, Gonzaga and Washington.

In 1949, the Martin Ski Dome saw 3' of snow fall the night of February 15 for a total of 16' on the ground.

The Husky Chalet at Martin was the home base and center for HWSC's skiing until the lodge was destroyed in 1949. Beginning in 1950, the club's activities took place on Stevens Pass. There are accounts of the lodge having burned after the 1949 ski season and collapsing under deep snow in 1956.

References 

Defunct ski areas and resorts in Washington (state)
Cascade Range
Buildings and structures in Kittitas County, Washington